This article presents a list of the historical events and publications of Australian literature during 1916.

Books 

 Sumner Locke – Samaritan Mary
 Rosa Praed – Sister Sorrow: A Story of Australian Life
 Katharine Susannah Prichard – Windlestraws

Short stories 

 Mary Gaunt – The Ends of the Earth: Stories
 Steele Rudd – Grandpa's Selection

Children's and Young Adult fiction 

 Mary Grant Bruce – Jim and Wally
 Ethel Turner – John of Daunt

Poetry 

 Christopher Brennan – "Irish to English: April 26, 1916"
 C. J. Dennis – The Moods of Ginger Mick
 Joseph Furphy and Kate Baker – The Poems of Joseph Furphy
 Leon Gellert – "The Last to Leave"
 Henry Lawson – "Black Bonnets"
 Will H. Ogilvie – The Australian and Other Verses

Biography 

 Douglas Sladen – From Boundary-Rider to Prime Minister: Hughes of Australia, The Man of the Hour

Births 

A list, ordered by date of birth (and, if the date is either unspecified or repeated, ordered alphabetically by surname) of births in 1916 of Australian literary figures, authors of written works or literature-related individuals follows, including year of death.

 26 January – Justina Williams, poet (died 2008)
 26 April – Morris West, novelist (died 1999)
 9 May – Helen Haenke, poet, playwright and artist (died 1978)
 1 August – Val Vallis, poet (died 2009)
 25 September – Jessica Anderson, novelist (died 2010)
 8 October – George Turner, novelist and critic (died 1997)
 14 December – Harold Stewart, poet and oriental scholar (died 1995)

Deaths 

A list, ordered by date of death (and, if the date is either unspecified or repeated, ordered alphabetically by surname) of deaths in 1916 of Australian literary figures, authors of written works or literature-related individuals follows, including year of birth.

 7 February – William Little, poet and politician (born 1839)

Unknown date:
 April – Frank Hutchinson, poet (born ca 1836)

See also 
 1916 in literature
 1916 in poetry
 List of years in literature
 List of years in Australian literature
 1916 in literature
 1915 in Australian literature
 1916 in Australia
 1917 in Australian literature

References

Literature
Australian literature by year
20th-century Australian literature